The 1936 Oklahoma Sooners football team represented the University of Oklahoma in the 1936 college football season. In their second year under head coach Biff Jones, the Sooners compiled a 3–3–3 record (1–2–2 against conference opponents), finished in fourth place in the Big Six Conference, and outscored their opponents by a combined total of 84 to 67.

No Sooners received All-America honors in 1936, but two Sooners received all-conference honors: tackle Ralph Brown and center Red Conkwright.

Schedule

NFL Draft
The following players were drafted into the National Football League following the season.

References

Oklahoma
Oklahoma Sooners football seasons
Oklahoma Sooners football